Charles Evans may refer to:

Actors and filmmakers
Charles Evans (businessman) (1926–2007), American business leader
Charles Evans Jr. (born 1963), his son, film producer
Carlo Burton, aka Charles Evans, film actor, producer and director

Sportspeople
Charles Evans (cricketer, born 1866) (1866–1956), English cricketer
Charles Evans (cricketer, born 1851) (1851–1909), English cricketer and British Army officer
Charles Evans (footballer) (1897–1939), Welsh footballer
Charley Evans, Negro league baseball player
Chick Evans (Charles E. Evans, Jr., 1890–1979), American amateur golfer
Chuck Evans (American football) (Charles Evans, 1967–2008), American football fullback
Chuck Evans (basketball) (born 1971), American basketball player

Politicians
Charles Evans (politician) (1882–1947), Liberal party member of the Canadian House of Commons
Charles R. Evans (1866–1954), American Representative from Nevada

Judges and attorneys
Charles Evans (Pennsylvania philanthropist) (1768–1847), American attorney and philanthropist who established Pennsylvania's Charles Evans Cemetery
Charles Evans Hughes (1862–1948), American Republican politician and Chief Justice of the U.S. Supreme Court 
Charles Evans Hughes Jr. (1889–1950), American Solicitor General
Charles Evans Whittaker (1901–1973), American Associate Justice of the Supreme Court

Others
Charles Evans (Royal Navy officer) (1908–1981),
Charles Evans (librarian) (1850–1935), American librarian and bibliographer
Sir Charles Evans (mountaineer) (1918–1995), UK mountaineer, surgeon, and educator
Charles Albert Evans (1912–2008), American physician and microbiologist
Charles L. Evans (born 1958), President of the Federal Reserve Bank of Chicago
Sir Charles Lovatt Evans (1884–1968), British physiologist
Charles Smart Evans (1778–1849), English vocalist and composer
Charles Evans Hughes III (1915–1985), American architect
Charles Evans (colonial businessman) (1827–1881)

See also
Charlie Evans (disambiguation)